Dewei, also known as DeAsh, is a town in the Garzê Tibetan Autonomous Prefecture of Sichuan, China which is only accessible through the J1 highway.

References 

Populated places in the Garzê Tibetan Autonomous Prefecture
Towns in Sichuan